Glenmore Bay is a remote, tidal, 150° orientated, coastal embayment, located on the southern coastline of the west to east orientated Ardnamurchan peninsula, at the head of the sea loch Loch Sunart.

Settlements
Glenmore Bay has small settlement at the head of the bay, and includes  the Ardnamurchan Natural History and Visitor Centre, which is a popular tourist destination. The tiny settlement of Glenbeg is east of the village. The minor single lane with passing places, B Road: B8007 provides access to the bay, and connects to the main  A861 at Salen  to the east, passing the villages of Glenborrodale, Laga and Salen, as it passes the beautiful curves of Loch Sunart.

Geography
Glenmore Bay is at the far eastern end of the Chord, followed by Port na Croisg to the west, followed by Camas Fearna to the final small bay, Camas Bàn before the Ardslignish peninsula. Glenmore Bay is separated from Port na Croisg, by the sometimes island of Eilean Mòr, which is separated from the land by a tidal river, and at times, a small peninsula. Glenmore Bay is a tidal bay with a long shore of machair and sea-grasses as the land meets the bay proper.

Gallery

References

Bays of Highland (council area)
Bays of Scotland
Lochaber
Ardnamurchan